Karl Paymah (born November 29, 1982) is a former American football cornerback. Paymah was last signed to the Saskatchewan Roughriders of the Canadian Football League. He was drafted by the Denver Broncos in the third round of the 2005 NFL Draft. He played college football at Washington State.

Paymah has also been a member of the Minnesota Vikings, San Francisco 49ers, and the Houston Texans

Early years
While attending Culver City High School in Culver City, California, Paymah was a two-sport standout in both football and track. In football, he won two varsity letters as both a wide receiver and a defensive back, and won first-team All-Ocean League honors as a defensive back.

College career
Karl Paymah attended Washington State University and was a letterman in football. In football, he ended his career there with three interceptions, 129 tackles, and 21 pass deflections.

Professional career

Denver Broncos
Paymah was drafted by the Denver Broncos in the third round of the 2005 NFL Draft. In four years with the team he played in 60 games, recording 101 tackles and three interceptions.

Minnesota Vikings
Paymah signed with the Minnesota Vikings on March 14, 2009; the deal was reportedly worth $1.55 million for one year.

San Francisco 49ers
On March 17, 2010, Paymah signed a one-year deal with the San Francisco 49ers. On September 3, he was cut by the 49ers.

Houston Texans
Paymah signed with the Houston Texans on September 28, 2010.

References

External links

Denver Broncos bio
Washington State Cougars bio

1982 births
Living people
Players of American football from Boston
American football cornerbacks
American football safeties
Washington State Cougars football players
Denver Broncos players
Minnesota Vikings players
San Francisco 49ers players
Houston Texans players
Saskatchewan Roughriders players